Edvard Kardelj (27 January 1910 – 10 February 1979), also known by the pseudonyms Bevc, Sperans, and Krištof, was a Yugoslav politician and economist. He was one of the leading members of the Communist Party of Slovenia before World War II. During the war, Kardelj was one of the leaders of the Liberation Front of the Slovenian People and a Slovene Partisan, and after the war he was a federal political leader in the Socialist Federal Republic of Yugoslavia and led the Yugoslav delegation in peace talks with Italy over the border dispute in the Julian March.

Kardelj was the main creator of the Yugoslav system of workers' self-management. He was an economist and a full member of both the Slovene Academy of Sciences and Arts and the Serbian Academy of Sciences and Arts. He also played a major role in foreign policy by designing the fundamental ideological basis for the Yugoslav policy of nonalignment in the 1950s and the 1960s.

Early years
Kardelj was born in Ljubljana. At the age of 16 he joined the Communist Party of Yugoslavia, where he was drafted under the influence of the Slovenian journalist Vlado Kozak. He studied to become a teacher but never worked as one. In 1930, he was arrested in Belgrade and convicted of being a member of the illegal Communist Party. He was released in 1932 and returned to Ljubljana, where he became one of the leaders of the Slovenian section of the party after most of its former members had either left the party or perished in Joseph Stalin's purges.  

In 1935, he went to Moscow to work for the Comintern. He was part of a group that survived Stalin's purge of the Yugoslav Communist leadership. Following Stalin's appointment of Josip Broz Tito as party leader, Kardelj became a leading member of the Party. The new leadership, centered around Tito, Aleksandar Ranković and Kardelj, returned to Yugoslavia in 1937 and launched a new party policy, calling for a common antifascist platform of all Yugoslav left-wing forces and for a federalization of Yugoslavia. The same year, an autonomous Communist Party of Slovenia was formed, with Kardelj as one of its leaders, together with Franc Leskošek (sl) and Boris Kidrič.

On 15 August 1939, Kardelj married Pepca Kardelj, sister of the (later) People's Hero and communist functionary Ivan Maček (a.k.a. Matija).

After the Axis invasion of Yugoslavia in April 1941, he became one of the leaders of the Liberation Front of the Slovenian People. In summer and autumn 1941, he helped to set up the armed resistance in Slovenia which fought against the occupying forces till May 1945, jointly with Tito's Partisans in what became known as the People's Liberation War of Yugoslavia.

Postwar years
After 1945, he rose to the highest positions in the Yugoslav government and moved into a luxury house in the Tacen neighborhood of Ljubljana that was confiscated from its previous owner, the industrialist Ivan Seunig. The house had been built in 1940 by the architect Bojan Stupica (1910–1970) and was initially occupied by the communist politician Boris Kraigher.

Between 1945 and 1947, Kardelj led the Yugoslav delegation that negotiated peace talks with Italy over the border dispute in the Julian March. After the Tito–Stalin split in 1948, he helped, with Milovan Đilas and Vladimir Bakarić, to devise a new economic policy in the Socialist Federal Republic of Yugoslavia, known as workers' self-management. In the 1950s, especially after Đilas's removal, he rose to become the main theorist of Titoism and Yugoslav workers' self-management.

Kardelj was shot and wounded in 1959 by Jovan Veselinov. Although the official police investigation concluded that Veselinov had been shooting at a wild boar and Kardelj was struck by a ricochet from a rock, it was suggested at the time that the assassination attempt was orchestrated by his political rival Aleksandar Ranković or Ranković's, ally Slobodan Penezić.

Kardelj's role diminished in the 1960s, for reasons that have yet to become clear. He again rose to prominence after 1973, when Tito removed the Croatian, Serbian and Slovenian reformist Communist leaderships, and restored a more orthodox party line. The following year he was one of the main authors of the 1974 Yugoslav Constitution which decentralized decision-making in the country, leaving the single republics under the leadership of their respective political leaderships.

Death and legacy
Kardelj died of colon cancer in Ljubljana on 10 February 1979.

During his lifetime, he was given several honors. He was appointed a member of the Slovene Academy of Sciences and Arts and was officially honored as a People's Hero of Yugoslavia. Apart from many streets, the entire coastal town of Ploče in southern Croatia was renamed Kardeljevo in his honour from 1950 to 1954 and again from 1980 to 1990. Immediately after his death, the University of Ljubljana changed its name to "Edvard Kardelj University of Ljubljana".

After the collapse of Yugoslavia, most of these were restored to their previous names, but in Slovenia there are still some street and square names that bear his name; for example, a square in Nova Gorica and in Velenje.

Edvard Kardelj was the father of the poet , who committed suicide in 1971. His wife Pepca Kardelj died of a heart attack in 1990 but was widely rumored to have committed suicide. His grandson is Igor Šoltes, a lawyer and politician.

See also
 AVNOJ
 Milovan Đilas
 Stane Dolanc
 Economy of the Socialist Federal Republic of Yugoslavia
 OZNA
 Workers' self-management
 Socialist Federal Republic of Yugoslavia
 Josip Broz Tito
 Titoism
 UDBA

References

Sources 
 Edvard Kardelj, Reminiscences: The struggle for recognition and independence of the new Yugoslavia, 1944–1957 (London: 1982)
 Széll, György. "Workers’ Participation in Yugoslavia." in The Palgrave Handbook of Workers’ Participation at Plant Level (Palgrave Macmillan, New York, 2019) pp. 167-186.
 Jože Pirjevec, Jugoslavija: nastanek, razvoj ter razpad Karadjordjevićeve in Titove Jugoslavije (Koper: Lipa, 1995).
 Janko Prunk, "Idejnopolitični nazor Edvarda Kardelja v okviru evropskega socializma" in Ferenčev zbornik, ed. Zdenko Čepič&Damijan Guštin (Ljubljana: Inštitut za novejšo zgodovino, 1997), 105-116. 
 Alenka Puhar, "Avtorstvo Razvoja slovenskega narodnostnega vprašanja: Ali bi k Speransu sodil še Anin, Alfa, mogoče Bor?", Delo (29 August 2001), 16.
 Alenka Puhar, "Skrivnostna knjiga o Slovencih, ki že sedemdeset let čaka na objavo", Delo (3 October 2001), 26.
 Božo Repe, Rdeča Slovenija: tokovi in obrazi iz obdobja socializma (Ljubljana: Sophia, 2003).

1910 births
1979 deaths
Politicians from Ljubljana
Slovenian people of World War II
Prešeren Award laureates
Comintern people
Yugoslav Partisans members
Slovenian atheists
Recipients of the Order of the People's Hero
League of Communists of Slovenia politicians
Slovenian Marxists
Members of the Academy of Sciences and Arts of Bosnia and Herzegovina
Members of the Serbian Academy of Sciences and Arts
Yugoslav expatriates in the Soviet Union
Deaths from colorectal cancer
International Lenin School alumni
Socialist economists
Burials at Žale
Marxist theorists
Recipients of the Order of the Hero of Socialist Labour